About Face is a British sitcom consisting of twelve unconnected half-hour episodes starring Maureen Lipman. Each episode featured a guest cast of familiar personalities. The first set of six installments was broadcast in November–December 1989 and the second set in January–February 1991.

The episodes were written by Richard Harris, Geoffrey Perkins, Chips Hardy and John Henderson, Astrid Ronning, John Wells, Paul Smith and Terry Kyan, Jack Rosenthal (Lipman's husband), Carol Bunyan, as well as Ian Hislop and Nick Newman.  It was made for the ITV network by Central Independent Television.

Plot
Each episode has a stand-alone plot with Maureen Lipman playing a different character each time. She described the women as having "a certain emptiness in their lives".

Episodes

Series One (1989)

Series Two (1991)

References
Mark Lewisohn, "Radio Times Guide to TV Comedy", BBC Worldwide Ltd, 2003
British TV Comedy Guide for About Face

External links

About Face at Phill.co.uk Comedy Guide

1989 British television series debuts
1991 British television series endings
1980s British sitcoms
1990s British sitcoms
ITV sitcoms
Television series by ITV Studios
English-language television shows
Television shows produced by Central Independent Television